Capt. Robin Bordoloi, is an Indian politician, a member of the Bharatiya Janata Party. Son of Gopinath Bordoloi, he is from the State of Assam.

He was elected to Dispur constituency in 2001, winning against AGP founder and former Chief Minister of Assam Prafulla Mahanta. He was elected to the Assam Legislative Assembly in 2006 and 2011, representing the Guwahati East constituency as an Indian National Congress candidate. His daughter, Ashima, contested the 2021 Assam Legislative Assembly.

References 

Living people
Bharatiya Janata Party politicians from Assam
Assam MLAs 2001–2006
Assam MLAs 2006–2011
Assam MLAs 2011–2016
Politicians from Guwahati
Indian National Congress politicians from Assam
Indian Army personnel
1942 births